Ebenezer is a rural locality in the City of Ipswich, Queensland, Australia.

Geography 
The locality is bounded to the north-west by the Bremer River and to north-east by the Yarrowlea-Jeebropilly railway line (a branch line off the Main Line railway). Despite the name, Ebenezer railway station is off Coopers Road in neighbouring Jeebropilly, just before the balloon loop at the end of the line. 

In the west of the locality is a former coal mine. The rehabilitation of the site has been controversial.

Geiger Lagoon  is a lake created from the   site of the Jeebropilly West open-cut mine, which closed in 2001.  The lagoon is named after the Geiger family, who were pioneer settlers from 1857 in the area.

Keanes Lagoon is a waterhole. It is named after the land owner John Richard Keane (1846-1927).

Apart from this the land use is a mix of rural residential living (mostly around Ebenezer Road and Mount Forbes Road) and grazing on native vegetation.

History 

Seven Mile Creek State School opened on 2 November 1868. In 1888 it was renamed Ebenezer State School. It closed in 1957. It was located at 354-356 Ebenezer Road (opposite the junction with Turnbull Road).

The locality takes its name from the Ebenezer Wesleyan (later Methodist) Church which opened on Sunday 23 April 1871 at Seven Mile Creek. Ebenezer is from a Hebrew word meaning rock of faith. It was opposite the school at 1 Turnbull Road (corner of Ebenezer Road). Now demolished, the church operated until at least 1942.

Education 
There are no schools in Ebenezer. The nearest primary schools are Rosewood State School in neighbouring Rosewood to the north-west and Mutdapilly State School in Mutdapilly to the south-east. The nearest secondary school is Rosewood State High School in Rosewood.

References 

City of Ipswich
Localities in Queensland